Moor or Moors may refer to:

Nature and ecology 
 Moorland, a habitat characterized by low-growing vegetation and acidic soils.

Ethnic and religious groups
 Moors, Muslim inhabitants of the Maghreb, Iberian Peninsula, Sicily, and Malta during the Middle Ages
 Moors, a variant name for Melungeon (tri-racial isolate groups) in colonial North America
 Moorish Orthodox Church of America, a syncretic, non-exclusive, and religious anarchist movement 
 Moorish Science Temple of America, an African-American Muslim religious group
 Mouros da Terra, native or half-native coastal Muslims in south India such as Mappila (Mouros Malabares/Moors Mopulars)
 Sri Lankan Moor, a minority Muslim group in Sri Lanka
 United Nuwaubian Nation of Moors, an American religious group founded and led by Dwight York, which includes (among others) Yamassee Native American Moors of the Creek Nation

People with the name
 Karl Marx, 19th century German philosopher and communist. Was known as “The Moor” by family and friends because of his darker complexion.
 Davey Ray Moor, Australian songwriter, singer, composer and producer
 David Moor (1947–2000), British general practitioner who was prosecuted for the euthanasia of a patient
 David Moor (cricketer) (born 1934), English cricketer
 Dmitry Moor (1883–1946), professional name of Dmitry Stakhievich Orlov, Russian artist
 Drew Moor (born 1984), American soccer player
 Edward Moor (1771–1848), British soldier and Indologist
 Els Moor (1937–2016), Surinamese educator, editor and book publisher 
 Emánuel Moór (1863–1931), Hungarian composer
 Felix Moor (1903–1955), Estonian journalist and actor 
 George Raymond Dallas Moor (1896–1918), recipient of the Victoria Cross
 Henry Moor (1809–1877), Mayor of Melbourne
 Ian Moor (born 1974), English singer
 James H. Moor, American philosopher
 Karl Moor (Swiss banker) (1853–1932), Swiss Communist
 Lova Moor (born 1946), French dancer, real name Marie-Claude Jourdain
 Marie Möör, French singer
 Paul Moor (born 1978), British Ten-pin Bowler
 Peter Moor (born 1991), Zimbabwean cricketer
 Terry Moor (born 1952), American tennis player
 William Moor (died 1765), Canadian sailor and explorer
 Wyman Moor (1811–1869), American politician

Places
 Moor, Nevada, United States
 Moor, the German spelling of Mór, a town in Fejér county, Hungary
 Moor Crichel, a village in southwest England
 Moor Island, uninhabited Canadian Arctic Archipelago islands in Kivalliq Region, Nunavut
 The Moor, Hawkhurst, a village green in Kent, England
 The Moor Quarter, a street in Sheffield, England
 Lower Moor, Village in Worcestershire, England

Animals
 Black Telescope (or Black Moor), a variety of goldfish
 Moor frog, native to Europe and Asia

Arts, entertainment, and media
 Moor (film), a 2015 Pakistani drama by Jamshed Mehmood
 The Moor (novel), the fourth book in Mary Russell detective series by Laurie R. King
 "The Moor" (The Borgias), a 2011 episode of the television series The Borgias
 Berber the Moor, a character in The Bastard Executioner
The Tragedy of Othello, the Moor of Venice, a tragedy by William Shakespeare, believed to have been written in 1603 and based on a story of Cinthio
 Un Capitano Moro ("A Moorish Captain"), a story by Cinthio (Giovanni Battista Giraldi), first published in 1565
 "Moor", a song by American metalcore band Every Time I Die from the album From Parts Unknown
 "The Moor", a song by Swedish metal band Opeth from the album Still Life

Other uses
 Mooring (watercraft), any permanent structure to which a vessel may be secured 
 Moors murders, murders of five children by Ian Brady and Myra Hindley between July 1963 and October 1965, in and around Manchester, England
 Massive online open research
 Red Moors, a Sardinian political party
 Moors Sundry Act of 1790, advisory resolution passed by South Carolina House of Representatives, clarifying the status of free subjects of the Sultan of Morocco

See also
 Andy Moor (disambiguation)
 Ben Moor (disambiguation)
 Blackamoors (disambiguation)
 De Moor
 Moor End (disambiguation)
 Moore (disambiguation)
 MOR (disambiguation)
 Mór (disambiguation)
 More (disambiguation)
 More (surname)
 The Moor (disambiguation)